Hallomenus scapularis is a species of polypore fungus beetle in the family Tetratomidae. It is found in North America.

References

Further reading

External links

 

Tenebrionoidea
Articles created by Qbugbot
Beetles described in 1846